Olivier Hakim Boumelaha (born 27 May 1981, in Mulhouse) is a French former football striker of Algerian descent. He last played for FC Gossau in the Swiss Challenge League. He is the older brother of Virgile Boumelaha and Sabri Boumelaha.

Career 
Boumelaha began his career with FC Basel in 1998 but made only one appearance for the club before moving on to FC St. Gallen in 2000. He failed to break into the first team there, also, and after a short spell at Etoile Carouge FC, he signed for FC La Chaux-de-Fonds where he played 14 games over the course of the 2004/05 season. He then moved to the United Arab Emirates with Al-Ittihad in July 2004 where he scored seven goals in just 15 appearances. This caught the eye of many European clubs and IFK Mariehamn of the Finnish Veikkausliiga acquired his services the next season. He scored twice in five matches there, but never broke into the starting XI and dropped down to the Ykkönen (Finland's second division) with Tampereen Peli-Pojat -70 in 2006. He scored goals despite a relatively low number of appearances at PP-70 but returned to the Middle East during the Summer of 2007, this time with Al Ahli of Bahrain. After just one season with The Eagles, he made his way back to Switzerland with FC Gossau of the Challenge League, he left on 18 December 2008 Gossau and will go to Dubai.

References

External links 
 Stats at Swiss Football League
 

1981 births
Living people
French footballers
Swiss Super League players
Swiss Challenge League players
Veikkausliiga players
French people of Kabyle descent
Association football forwards
FC Gossau players
FC Basel players
FC St. Gallen players
IFK Mariehamn players
Expatriate footballers in Bahrain
French expatriate sportspeople in Bahrain
Footballers from Mulhouse
French expatriate footballers
French expatriate sportspeople in Finland
Expatriate footballers in Finland
Expatriate footballers in the United Arab Emirates
French expatriate sportspeople in the United Arab Emirates
French expatriate sportspeople in Switzerland
Expatriate footballers in Switzerland
Al-Ittihad Kalba SC players
UAE Pro League players